Corning is an unincorporated community in Reeve Township, Daviess County, Indiana.

History
A post office was established at Corning in 1893, and remained in operation until it was discontinued in 1902.

Geography

References

Unincorporated communities in Daviess County, Indiana
Unincorporated communities in Indiana